Jhon Édison Rodríguez Quevedo (born 24 January 1991) is a Colombian fencer. He competed in the men's épée event at the 2016 Summer Olympics.

References

External links
 

1991 births
Living people
Colombian male épée fencers
Olympic fencers of Colombia
Fencers at the 2016 Summer Olympics
Fencers at the 2019 Pan American Games
Pan American Games bronze medalists for Colombia
Pan American Games medalists in fencing
Medalists at the 2019 Pan American Games
Sportspeople from Valle del Cauca Department
20th-century Colombian people
21st-century Colombian people
South American Games gold medalists for Colombia
South American Games bronze medalists for Colombia
South American Games medalists in fencing
Competitors at the 2018 South American Games
Competitors at the 2022 South American Games